Nicole Stansbury (born May 14, 1963 in Whittier, California) is an American novelist, short story and essay writer.

Biography
She earned a BA (1986) in English and an MFA (1991) in Creative Writing from the University of Utah.

Her novel Places to Look for a Mother (2002) and her collection of short stories The Husband's Dilemma (2004) were published by Carroll & Graf, and her shorter works have appeared in The Threepenny Review, PRISM international, and Yellow Silk.

Stansbury's works concern a range of issues including modern life in the western United States, particularly life in Utah. She has been praised for her insightful and compelling depiction of the life of non-Mormons in Mormon-dominated Utah, and more generally for her keen eye for telling detail. The setting for most of her work is domestic: her first novel concerns a mother-daughter relationship in the midst of a disintegrating family. Her stories include tales of husbands, wives and children navigating the trauma of life in contemporary America, and is sometimes humorous and at other times harrowing.

Awards and honors
Stansbury has been honored numerous times for her work including several grants from the Utah Arts Council. Places to Look for a Mother won Stansbury the Barnes & Noble "Discover New Writers" award, and The Husband's Dilemma won the 2005 Utah Book Award.

References

External links
Static – MP3 Audio, read by the author
An Authentic Take on Flaky Parenting – review of Places to Look for a Mother
Leap – online story

1963 births
Living people
21st-century American novelists
American women novelists
University of Utah alumni
Writers from Whittier, California
21st-century American women writers